The following highways are numbered 750:

Costa Rica
 National Route 750

United States